Tasoula Georgiou Hadjitofi (Greek: Τασούλα Γεωργίου Χατζητοφή) was born in 1959 in Cyprus and lives in the Netherlands. She is an author, a cultural activist  and an entrepreneur.

Combating art trafficking 
Hadjitofi, also known as "Icon Hunter", began her work repatriating stolen artifacts in the early 1980s and is best known for orchestrating the “Munich Case”, one of the largest art trafficking sting operations in European history.  Her efforts led to the arrest of the Turkish art smuggler Aydin Dikmen and the confiscation of over $60 million' worth of looted artifacts from Cyprus and around the world.

It began when as Honorary Consul to Cyprus (a non-paid position), she was approached by Michel van Rijn, an art dealer turned informant, wishing to exchange information about stolen Cypriot treasures in return for payment.  Tasoula spent the next ten years of her life tracking down information and leads from both Van Rijn and her own research, culminating in the planning and execution of the Munich Case.

In 1999, at the height of her accomplishment, Hadjitofi was removed from office because her contribution to her country was overshadowing the paid diplomats and civil servants. Fifteen years later, due to mismanagement, the case remained in the courts. In addition to this, Aydin Dikmen, sued the Church of Cyprus for ownership of the stolen treasures that he was convicted of stealing from Cyprus and the stolen artifacts remain in the possession of the German Police. Meanwhile, the people of Cyprus had no access to their cultural heritage, until the most recent Court of Appeal of the Court of Munich. The court decision of the 18th of March 2013 made it possible for the remaining Cypriot artifacts to return to Cyprus, as they are now indisputably Cypriot.

These experiences led Tasoula Hadjitofi to create “Walk Of Truth”, a non-governmental organization with the mission of combating art trafficking by creating reforms to protect cultural heritage in conflict areas.

Personal life and career 

Tasoula Hadjitofi was born and raised in Famagusta Cyprus. In 1974, she and her family were forced to flee their home due to the Turkish Invasion of Cyprus and the outbreak of the war. She went on to become a successful entrepreneur, founding Octagon Professionals International, a company specializing in the provision of IT services and professional manpower to clients throughout Europe and Asia. She was the first woman (and youngest person at the age of 27) to be appointed Honorary Consul to Cyprus in her adopted country of the Netherlands. She served as Representative of the Church of Cyprus where she sought justice for the looting of Cyprus' cultural heritage through repatriation of its stolen religious artifacts. Her work with Archbishop Chrysostomos I culminated in the orchestrating the Munich Operation, which led to the arrest of art trafficker Aydin Dikmen and the recovery of over $60 million of stolen antiquities from Cyprus and around the world.

Tasoula Hadjitofi is married to Dr. Michael Hadjitofi and is a mother to son Andreas and daughters Sophia and Marina.

Walk of Truth 
Mrs. Hadjitofi’s non-governmental organization, Walk of Truth, engages the public about the importance of protecting global heritage. Walk of Truth organizes debates about art trafficking and restitution and rallies governments, political leaders legislatures, law enforcement, museums and cultural organizations for global unity in combatting art trafficking and protecting cultural heritage in areas of conflict. Its latest initiative, Cultural Crime Watchers Worldwide (CCWW) empowers people to leave anonymous tips to do with the destruction and looting of cultural heritage. Walk of Truth connects people with cultural heritage and cultural heritage with people.

Accolades 

She was nominated as “Woman of Europe 2008”, for her outstanding work in fighting art trafficking. Tasoula Hadjitofi was the first female to be awarded the highest honor in Cyprus, the Order of St Barnabas.

References 

1959 births
Living people
Cultural heritage
Cypriot philanthropists